Sir James Hamilton, 2nd Bt. (1682-1750), of Rosehall, Lanark, was Member of Parliament for Clydesdale, Lanarkshire, in the British Parliament and a Jacobite.

James Hamilton, baptized on 24 November 1682, was the third, but eldest surviving son of Sir Archibald Hamilton, 1st Bt., of Rosehall by his 2nd wife Bethia, daughter of Sir Patrick Murray of Deuchar, Forfar.  James married on 2 March 1707, Frances, daughter of Alexander Stuart, 4th Lord Blantyre  He succeeded his father as 2nd Bt. in November 1709.

A Lanarkshire Justice of the Peace, he was returned Member of Parliament without a contest for Lanarkshire in 1710 with the support of the Duke of Hamilton. He was largely inactive and did not stand for re-election in 1715. However, he returned to Parliament in 1735 until he died in 1750.

He died childless on 15 March 1750 and the estate and baronetcy passed to his brother Hugh, who died unmarried in 1755. The title became extinct and Rosehall passed first to Hamilton’s half-sister, Margaret, and thereafter to her eldest son, Archibald Hamilton of Dalzell.

References 

1682 births
1750 deaths
People from Lanarkshire
Baronets in the Baronetage of Nova Scotia
Members of the Parliament of Great Britain for Scottish constituencies
British MPs 1710–1713
British MPs 1713–1715
British MPs 1734–1741
British MPs 1741–1747
British MPs 1747–1754
Scottish Jacobites